Fabiola Forteza (born 4 August 1995) is a Canadian rugby union player.

Forteza competed for Canada at the delayed 2021 Rugby World Cup in New Zealand. She featured against the Eagles in the quarterfinals, against England in the semifinal, and in the third place final against France.

References

External links 

 Fabiola Forteza at Canada Rugby

Living people
1995 births
Female rugby union players
Canadian female rugby union players
Canada women's international rugby union players